Bajna may refer to:

 Bajna, Hungary
 Bajna, India
 Bajna, Pakistan